The unseen species problem is commonly referred to in ecology and deals with the estimation of the number of species represented in an ecosystem that were not observed by samples. It more specifically relates to how many new species would be discovered if more samples were taken in an ecosystem. The study of the unseen species problem was started in the early 1940s by Alexander Steven Corbet. He spent 2 years in British Malaya trapping butterflies and was curious how many new species he would discover if he spent another 2 years trapping. Many different estimation methods have been developed to determine how many new species would be discovered given more samples. The unseen species problem also applies more broadly, as the estimators can be used to estimate any new elements of a set not previously found in samples. An example of this is determining how many words William Shakespeare knew based on all of his written works.

The unseen species problem can be broken down mathematically as follows: If  independent samples are taken, and then if  more independent samples were taken, the number of unseen species that will be discovered by the additional samples is given by

with  being the second set of  samples.

History
In the early 1940s Alexander Steven Corbet spent 2 years in British Malaya trapping butterflies. He kept track of how many species he observed, and how many members of each species were captured. For example, there were 74 different species of which he captured only 2 individual butterflies.

When Corbet returned to the United Kingdom, he approached biostatistician Ronald Fisher and asked how many new species of butterflies he could expect to catch if he went trapping for another two years; in essence, Corbet was asking how many species he observed zero times.

Fisher responded with a simple estimation: for an additional 2 years of trapping, Corbet could expect to capture 75 new species. He did this using a simple summation (data provided by Orlitsky in the table from the Example below:

Here  corresponds to the number of individual species that were observed  times. Fisher's sum was later confirmed by Good–Toulmin.

Estimators 
Let  be the number of individual species observed  times (for example, if there were 74 species of butterflies with 2 observed members throughout the  samples, then ).

The Good–Toulmin estimator 
The Good–Toulmin (GT) estimator was developed by Good and Toulmin in 1953. The estimate of the unseen species based on the Good–Toulmin estimator is given by

The Good–Toulmin Estimator has been shown to be a good estimate for values of  The Good–Toulmin estimator also approximately satisfies

This means that  estimates  to within  as long as 

To compensate for this, Efron and Thisted in 1976 showed that a truncated Euler transform can also be a usable estimate (the "ET" estimate):

with

where  and

where  is the location chosen to truncate the Euler transform.

The smoothed Good–Toulmin estimator 
Similar to the approach by Efron and Thisted, Alon Orlitsky, Ananda Theertha Suresh, and Yihong Wu developed the smooth Good–Toulmin estimator. They realized that the Good–Toulmin estimator failed because of the exponential growth, and not its bias. Therefore, they estimated the number of unseen species by truncating the series

The resulting estimator is

This method was chosen because the bias of  shifts signs due to the  coefficient. Averaging over a distribution of  therefore reduces the bias. This means that the estimator can be written as the linear combination of the prevalence:

Depending on the distribution of  chosen, the results will vary.

Species discovery curve 
The species discovery curve can also be used. This curve relates the number of species found in an area as a function of the time.

A species discovery curve is always increasing, as there is never a sample that could decrease the number of discovered species. Furthermore, the species discovery curve is also decelerating the more samples taken, the fewer unseen species are expected to be discovered. The species discovery curve will also never asymptote, as it is assumed that although the discovery rate might become infinitely slow, it will never actually stop. Two common models for a species discovery curve are the logarithmic and the exponential function.

Example – Corbet's butterflies 
As an example, consider the data Corbet provided Fisher in the 1940s. Using the Good–Toulmin model, the number of unseen species is found using

 {| class="wikitable"
|+ Data provided to Fisher by Corbet
!Number of observed members, 
!1
!2
!3
!4
!5
!6
!7
!8
!9
!10
!11
!12
!13
!14
!15
|-
|Number of species, 
|118
|74
|44
|24
|29
|22
|20
|19
|20
|15
|12
|14
|6
|12
|6
|}
This relationship is shown in the plot below.
 
This plot also acts as a species discovery curve for this ecosystem and defines how many new species will be discovered as  increases (and more samples are taken).

Other uses 
There are numerous uses for the predictive algorithm. Knowing that the estimators are accurate, it allows scientists to extrapolate accurately the results of polling people by a factor of 2. They can predict the number of unique answers based on the number of people that have answered similarly. The method can also be used to determine the extent of someone's knowledge. A prime example is determining how many unique words Shakespeare knew based on the written works we have today.

Example – How many words did Shakespeare know? 
Based on research of Shakespeare's known works done by Thisted and Efron, there are 884,647 total words. The research also found that there are at total of  different words that appear more than 100 times. Therefore, the total number of unique words was found to be 31,534. Applying the Good–Toulmin model, if an equal number of works by Shakespeare were discovered, then it is estimated that  unique words would be found. Thisted and Efron estimate that , meaning that Shakespeare most likely knew over twice as many words as he actually used in all of his writings.

See also 

 Species discovery curve
 Alexander Steven Corbet
 Ronald Fisher
 German tank problem

References 

Ecology
Biostatistics